Madera Station is a proposed train station to serve Madera, California. It would be located near the intersection of Avenue 12 and Santa Fe Drive.

The Madera Amtrak station opened in 2010 as a replacement for the hundred-year old Storey station. The 2016 California High-Speed Rail Business Plan proposed a relocated Madera station in order to provide strong transit connectivity, potential for transit oriented development, good access to State Route 99 and the City of Madera, and connections between that system and Amtrak San Joaquins services. Funding for the station was provided as part of the Valley Rail project in 2018. Work on station relocation is ongoing , as the San Joaquin Joint Powers Authority has entered into negotiations with CAHSR, Madera County, and the city of Madera. , the new station is expected to open in 2024.

References

External links
Madera Station Relocation Project — via San Joaquin Joint Powers Authority

Proposed California High-Speed Rail stations
Madera, California
Railway stations in Madera County, California
Railway stations scheduled to open in 2024